Rudolph Fentz (also spelled as Rudolf Fenz) is the focal character of "I'm Scared", a 1951 science fiction short story by Jack Finney, which was later reported as an urban legend as if the events had truly happened. The story tells of a 19th-century-looking young man possessing items of that period who is found confused in the middle of  Times Square in the 1950s before being hit by a car and killed, suggesting that he had, perhaps involuntarily, time travelled about a century forwards.

The story of Rudolph Fentz became one of the more significant urban legends of the 1980s and has been repeated occasionally since. With the spread of the Internet in the 1990s, it has been reported more often as a reproduction of facts and presented as evidence for the existence of time travel.

Urban legend
The Fentz legend describes how one evening in mid-June 1951, at about 11:15 p.m., passersby at New York City's Times Square noticed a man of about 29 years of age, dressed in the fashion of the late 19th century. No one observed how he had arrived there, and he was disoriented and confused standing in the middle of an intersection. He was hit by a taxi and fatally injured, before people were able to intervene.

The officials at the morgue searched his body and found the following items in his pockets:
A copper token for a beer worth 5 cents, bearing the name of a saloon, which was unknown, even to older residents of the area;
A bill for the care of a horse and the washing of a carriage, drawn by a livery stable on Lexington Avenue that was not listed in any address book;
About 70 dollars in old banknotes;
Business cards with the name Rudolph Fentz and an address on Fifth Avenue;
A letter sent to this address, in June 1876 from Philadelphia;
A medal for coming 3rd in a three-legged race.
None of these objects showed any signs of aging.
Captain Hubert V. Rihm of the Missing Persons Department of NYPD tried using this information to identify the man. He found that the address on Fifth Avenue was part of a business; its current owner did not know Rudolph Fentz. Fentz's name was not listed in the address book, his fingerprints were not recorded anywhere, and no one had reported him missing. Rihm continued the investigation and finally found a Rudolph Fentz Jr. in a telephone book from 1939. Rihm spoke to the residents of the apartment building at the listed address who remembered Fentz and described him as a man about 60 years who had worked nearby. After his retirement, he moved to an unknown location in 1940. Contacting the bank, Rihm was told that Fentz died five years before, but his widow was still alive but lived in Florida. Rihm contacted her and learned that her husband's father (Rudolph Fentz) had disappeared in 1876, aged 29. He had left the house for an evening walk and never returned. All efforts to locate him were in vain and no trace remained.

Captain Rihm checked the missing persons files on Rudolph Fentz in 1876. The description of his appearance, age, and clothing corresponded precisely to the appearance of the unidentified dead man from Times Square. The case was still marked unsolved. Fearing he would be held mentally incompetent, Rihm never noted the results of his investigation in the official files.

Short story
Since 1972, the unexplained disappearance and reappearance of Rudolph Fentz has been mentioned in books (such as those by Viktor Farkas) and articles, and later on the Internet, portrayed as a real event. The story has been cited as evidence for various theories and assumptions about the topic of time travel.

In 2000, after the Spanish magazine Más Allá published a representation of the events as a factual report, folklore researcher Chris Aubeck investigated the description to check its veracity. His research led to the conclusion that the people and events of the story were fictional. Aubeck found that the Fentz-story appeared for the first time in the 1972 May/June issue of the Journal of Borderland Research, which published it as a factual report. The magazine was published by the Borderland Sciences Research Foundation, a society that addressed UFO sightings with esoteric explanations. The magazine sourced the story to the book published in 1953, A Voice from the Gallery by Ralph M. Holland. Aubeck believed the origin of the fictional story had been found.

In August 2001, after Aubeck had published his research in the Akron Beacon Journal, Pastor George Murphy contacted him to explain that the original source was older still. Ralph M. Holland had taken the story about Rudolph Fentz completely from either a 1952 Robert Heinlein science fiction anthology, entitled Tomorrow, the Stars, or a short story printed in Collier's magazine. The true author was the renowned science fiction writer Jack Finney (1911–1995), and the Fentz episode was part of the short story "I'm Scared", which was first published in Collier's magazine on 15 September 1951. The story describes a character called Rudolph Fentz behaving as described in the urban legend, with the narrator Captain Hubert V. Rihm giving his opinions of the case.

References

External links 
 Explanations:
 
 
 

Literary characters introduced in 1951
Fictional people from the 19th-century
Time travelers
Male characters in literature
Urban legends
Science fiction characters
Legendary American people
Works by Jack Finney